Czermin  is a village in Mielec County, Subcarpathian Voivodeship, in south-eastern Poland. It is the seat of the gmina (administrative district) called Gmina Czermin.

The village has a population of 1,557.

The village was first mentioned in 1190. After the First Partition of Poland in a part of the village, in the course of Josephine colonization, ethnic Germans, dominationally mixed (Roman Catholic, Lutheran and Calvinist) settled here in 1783.

References

Czermin